Ohtodo Dam  is an earthfill dam located in Hokkaido Prefecture in Japan. The dam is used for flood control and irrigation. The catchment area of the dam is 10.2 km2. The dam impounds about 17  ha of land when full and can store 1729 thousand cubic meters of water. The construction of the dam was started on 1983 and completed in 2003.

References

Dams in Hokkaido